Vonitsa is a town in the northwestern part of Aetolia-Acarnania in Greece, seat of the municipality of Aktio-Vonitsa. Population 4,916 (2011). The beach town is situated on the south coast of the Ambracian Gulf, and is dominated by a Venetian fortress on a hill. The Greek National Road 42 (Lefkada - Amfilochia) passes through Vonitsa.

Settlements

Vonitsa proper 
Aktio, the ancient Actium
Nea Kamarina

History

Vonitsa is built near the site of ancient Anactorium, an important city of Acarnania, founded by the Corinthians in 630 BC. Like the other cities of Acarnania, it went into decline when the Romans founded Nicopolis on the other side of the Ambracian Gulf after the Battle of Actium, and forced its inhabitants to move to that city. Modern Vonitsa was founded during the Byzantine era. Vonitsa was controlled by the Republic of Venice between 1684 and 1797. After the Greek War of Independence, the town became a part of the Kingdom of Greece in 1832.

On 18th October 1862 the insurrection that later spread to Athens and lead to the overthrow of King Otto of Greece, started in Vonitsa.

Population

International relations

Vonitsa is twinned with:
 Połaniec, Poland since 2001.

See also

List of settlements in Aetolia-Acarnania
Diocese of Vonitsa

References

Populated places in Aetolia-Acarnania
Mediterranean port cities and towns in Greece